XHFIL-FM is a radio station on 88.9 FM in Mazatlán, Sinaloa, Mexico. It is operated by MegaRadio and carries its Switch pop format.

History

XENH-AM 1590 received its concession on June 30, 1960. It was owned by Gerardo Millán Ríos and broadcast from Escuinapa with 1,000 watts day and 200 night. In one week in January 1986, XENH was authorized to become XEFIL-AM and to move to 870 kHz in Mazatlán. It was sold to the current concessionaire in 1994. For most of this time, it aired a Regional Mexican format under the Magia Digital name until 2009, when Magia Digital moved to XHVU-FM 97.1 and XEFIL began broadcasting a news/talk format "Radio Noticias 870". 

XEFIL moved to FM in 2010. In 2012 Radiorama began operating the station and adopted the "W Radio" franchise from Televisa Radio; in 2013, the station switched a Regional Mexican format as La Sinaloense.

In May 2016, the station flipped to English classic hits as Éxtasis Digital, which had been on XHVU-FM, when MegaRadio resumed operating that station. MegaRadio reassumed operations of XHFIL in 2017 and moved its Switch pop format from  XHZS-FM 100.3.

References

Radio stations in Sinaloa